Orient (German title: Frauenraub in Marokko) is a 1928 German silent adventure film directed by Gennaro Righelli and starring Dolly Davis, Vladimir Gajdarov and Claire Rommer. It was shot at the Halensee Studios in Berlin. The film's art direction was by Otto Erdmann and Hans Sohnle. It premiered at the Ufa-Pavillon am Nollendorfplatz.

Cast
 Dolly Davis as Daisy  
 Vladimir Gajdarov
 Claire Rommer as Elinor  
 Gregori Chmara 
 Aruth Wartan as Ros Ben Rawak 
 Charlie Charlia as Bobby

References

Bibliography
 Hans-Michael Bock and Tim Bergfelder. The Concise Cinegraph: An Encyclopedia of German Cinema. Berghahn Books.

External links

1928 films
Films of the Weimar Republic
Films directed by Gennaro Righelli
German silent feature films
Films set in Morocco
German black-and-white films
Films shot at Halensee Studios
German adventure films
1928 adventure films
1920s German films